The Mizpah Lodge Building on Front St. in Sheldon, North Dakota was built in 1905.  It has also been known as Mel's Country Grocery.  It is a fraternal/commercial block building. It was listed on the National Register of Historic Places in 2005.

History
The two-story brick  building was built for Mizpah Lodge #39, a Masonic lodge chartered in 1893. 
It "was one of the masonic "blue" lodges, the common denominators of Masonry inasmuch as it was in such lodges that the initial three degrees - Entered Apprentice, Fellowcraft
and Master Mason - were conferred on the candidate."  The lodge had 11 charter members, and met in Sheldon's I.O.O.F hall and then in A.O.U.W. halls.  It began construction of its own building in 1905 when membership had reached 54 and there were at least seven fraternal organizations in town, with scheduling of meeting times being an issue.
The building's second floor consisted of  a main lodge hall, club room, kitchen, and club room lavatory.  The first floor was occupied by a succession of commercial operations.  Business types on the ground floor space included various retail enterprises including Mel's Country Grocery.

References

Masonic buildings in North Dakota
Clubhouses on the National Register of Historic Places in North Dakota
Commercial buildings completed in 1905
Commercial buildings on the National Register of Historic Places in North Dakota
National Register of Historic Places in Ransom County, North Dakota
1905 establishments in North Dakota
Masonic buildings completed in 1905